Takahatenamun (Takahatamun, Takhahatamani) was a Nubian queen dated to the Twenty-fifth Dynasty of Egypt.

Family 

Takahat(en)amun was the daughter of King Piye and the sister-wife of King Taharqa. She held several titles: Noble Lady (iryt p't), Great of Praises (wrt hzwt), King's Wife (hmt niswt), Lady of All Women (hnwt hmwt nbwt), and King's Sister (snt niswt).

Attestations 

Takahat(en)amun is known from a temple scene of the temple of Mut in Gebel Barkal where she is shown standing behind Taharqa who is offering to Amun-Re and Mut.

George Andrew Reisner proposed that Takatamun might have been buried in Nuri in Tomb 21. The tomb is dated, however, to the time of King Senkamanisken, meaning that the queen would have had to have died in her seventies or later if she were buried there.

References

7th-century BC Egyptian women
Queens consort of the Twenty-fifth Dynasty of Egypt
Taharqa
7th-century BC Egyptian people